Events in the year 1967 in Bolivia.

Incumbents
President: René Barrientos
Vice President: Luis Adolfo Siles Salinas

Events
August 31 - 9 members of Che Guevara's guerrillas are killed in government ambush
October - Ñancahuazú Guerrilla defeated by Government of Bolivia with CIA assistance. Che Guevara captured and executed

Births

Deaths
August 31 - Tamara Bunke, Argentine-born East German revolutionary, killed in ambush by Bolivian Army
October 9
Che Guevara, Argentine-born Marxist revolutionary involved in Cuban Revolution and Simba Rebellion in Republic of the Congo (Léopoldville) (now Democratic Republic of the Congo)
Simeon Cuba Sarabia, Bolivian trade unionist and revolutionary, associate of Che Guevara

 
1960s in Bolivia